Les crises de l'âme is the third studio album by French pop singer Jeanne Mas, released in 1989.

It marked a change in writing and musical style; indeed, unlike the two previous studio albums, lyrics were not written by Romano Musumarra, but by the singer herself, the songs deals with society themes and the music is also much less commercial.

It was charted from February 26, 1989, debuting at #5 before climbing to #1 where it remained for 4 weeks. It totaled fourteen weeks in the top ten and thirty-six weeks in the top 40. It was certified double gold.

Four singles were released from this album, but only "Y'a des bons..." was a hit, reaching the top 13 in France.

Track listing
"Les crises de l'âme" (Jeanne Mas, Massimo Calabrese, Piero Calabrese, Roberto Zaneli) – 5:00
"Carolyne" (Jeanne Mas, Massimo Calabrese, Piero Calabrese, Roberto Zaneli) – 4:00
"Tango" (Jeanne Mas) – 4:57
"Y'a des bons..." (Jeanne Mas, Massimo Calabrese, Piero Calabrese, Roberto Zaneli) – 4:54
"Bébé rock" (Jeanne Mas) – 5:20
"Contre toi" (Jeanne Mas, Massimo Calabrese, Piero Calabrese, Roberto Zaneli) – 3:30
"Flip trip" (Jeanne Mas, Pasquale Minieri) – 4:27
"Bulles" (Jeanne Mas, Massimo Calabrese, Piero Calabrese, Roberto Zaneli) – 4:23
"J'accuse" (Jeanne Mas, Massimo Calabrese, Piero Calabrese, Roberto Zaneli) – 4:55
"Comme un héros" (Jeanne Mas, Massimo Calabrese, Piero Calabrese, Roberto Zaneli) – 5:03
"Dites-lui" (Jeanne Mas) – 1:52

Album credits

Personnel
Vocals - Jeanne Mas
Background vocals - Graziella Madrigal ("Bulles")
Guitar - Marco Papazian ("Les crises de l'âme"), David Rhodes
Acoustic guitar - José Souc ("Tango")
Bass & Chapman stick - Tony Levin
Keyboards & programming - Piero Calabrese
Drums - Manu Katché
Percussion - Steve Shehan
Saxophone - Patrick Bourgoin

Production
Producers - Piero Calabrese & Jeanne Mas
Arrangements - Piero Calabrese
Engineer & mixing - Gordon Lyon at Musika Studios
Assistant engineers - Laurent Patte, Olivier Richter
Engineer (drums) - Nicolas Garin at Studio Davout
Management - Christian Blanchard

Design
Photography - Ennio Antonangeli
Cover design - Jeanne Mas

Charts, certifications and sales

References

External links
 Official site

1989 albums
Jeanne Mas albums